Dera Bhattian  is a traditional rural village of Pakistani Punjab in Chak No 9 RB, Tehsil Safdarabad,  Sheikhupura District of Pakistan. It lies in the rolling flat plains of northeast Punjab, at 195 metres (640 ft) above sea level. This village falls in National Assembly Constituency NA-122 (Sheikhupura-IV). In General Election 2018 Sardar Muhammad Irfan Dogar  of Khas Kakar Gill, Tehsil & District Sheikhupura became MNA. Village is connected to major cities like Lahore, Sheikhupura, Islamabad and Peshawar through M2 Motorway via Khanqan Dogran interchange. Lahore Sargodha road is also available for local movement. Safdarabad railway station is 4 km away from village and used for rail journey towards Lahore, Faisalabad and Karachi.

History
The village was founded before independence of Pakistan (before year 1900 AD). It was initially resided by Sikhs and named as Dera Sahib Ditta on name of a Sikh religious figure. Locals renamed the village as Dera Bhattian or Kot Rahmat Khan on arrival of Choudhary Rahmat Khan Bhatti from Ameen Ka Chak, Jaranwala. Nearby villages are Mahtabah Chak 9RB, Neewan Pind and Qila Mir Zaman.

People
People in the village are living in houses made of bricks and concrete. These typically have three to five rooms which house extended families. By religion they are 100% Muslims.

Geology
Dera Bhattian is part of the alluvial plains between the Himalayan foothills and the central core of the Indian subcontinent. The alluvial deposits are typically over a thousand feet thick. The interfluves are believed to have been formed during the Late Pleistocene and feature river terraces.

Television, Radio and Telecommunication
Pakistan Television Corporation (PTV) is the state-owned regulated television whose broadcast channels of PTV Home and PTV News are available to the village TV receivers. Radio Pakistan broadcasts government regulated medium waves radio which is providing information and entertainment of people.

Pakistan Telecommunication Authority (PTA) is the main provider of fixed line communication, mobile and broadband services to village. Mobile services by Mobilink, Telenor, Ufone and Zong are available in the village.

Economy
The Rakh Branch canal passes near one side of the village, moving to Sangla Hill and is an irrigation source for agricultural land. Most of the residents are landlords, agriculturists and cattle farmers. They farm wheat, rice, sugarcane, vegetable, fodder and produce milk and dairy products. Few of them are employees of Civil Govt, Pakistan Army, Pakistan Airforce and Airports Security Force. Other are linked with public transportation, goods transport, foreign employment.

Education
The Village has two Govt schools of primary education level; one each for boys and girls education. Literacy rate is 80%.

Worship

The Village has two mosques for Muslim prayers.

References

Punjab, Pakistan
Villages in Pakistan